Chlorproethazine, sold under the brand name Neuriplege, is a drug of the phenothiazine group described as a muscle relaxant or tranquilizer which is or has been marketed in Europe as a topical cream for the treatment of muscle pain. It has been associated with photoallergic contact dermatitis.

Synthesis
Chlorproethazine can be synthesized from a diphenylsulfide derivative. The general scheme is sufficiently flexible to permit the interchange of the order of some of the steps. 

Thus alkylation of 2-(2-bromo-phenylsulfanyl)-5-chloro-aniline [105790-02-1] (1) with 3-chloro-1-diethylaminopropane [104-77-8] (2) leads to the intermediate (3). Ring closure as above by nucleophilic aromatic displacement leads to the antipsychotic drug chlorproethazine (4).

The last step uses copper powder and is a form of the Ullmann condensation (i.e. the Goldberg reaction).

References

Analgesics
Chloroarenes
Phenothiazines
Diethylamino compounds